Hans Christiansen may refer to:
 Hans Christiansen (sailor)
 Hans Christiansen (artist)
 Hans Jørgen Christiansen, Danish footballer